Louis Nelson Katz (1897 in Pinsk, Russian Empire - 1973) was an American cardiologist. Katz has written more than 500 publications on hemodynamics, electrocardiography, hypertension, experimental atherosclerosis, the coronary circulation, myocardial metabolism, and more.

Awards
 Lasker-DeBakey Clinical Medical Research Award (1956)

References

External links
Allen B. Weisse, Remembering Louis N. Katz, Circulation 1997

1897 births
1973 deaths
American cardiologists
Emigrants from the Russian Empire to the United States